Boulouparis is a commune in the South Province of New Caledonia, an overseas territory of France in the Pacific Ocean.

Geography

Climate

Boulouparis has a tropical savanna climate (Köppen climate classification Aw) closely bordering on a semi-arid climate (BSh).

Twin towns – sister cities

Boulouparis is twinned with:
 Biloela, Australia
 Huahine, French Polynesia

References

Communes of New Caledonia